The men's individual road race was an event at the 1992 Summer Olympics in Barcelona, Spain. There were 154 participants from 61 nations, with 84 cyclists completing the race. The maximum number of cyclists per nation was three. The event was won by Fabio Casartelli of Italy, the nation's first victory in the men's individual road race since 1968 and fourth overall (two more than any other nation). Erik Dekker's silver was the first medal for the Netherlands in the event since 1972. Dainis Ozols gave Latvia its first medal in the event in the country's first independent appearance since 1936.

Background

This was the 14th appearance of the event, previously held in 1896 and then at every Summer Olympics since 1936. It replaced the individual time trial event that had been held from 1912 to 1932 (and which would be reintroduced alongside the road race in 1996). A young triathlete from the United States named Lance Armstrong was among the favorites, along with Erik Dekker of the Netherlands. 

Antigua and Barbuda, Aruba, Bahrain, Benin, the Central African Republic, Estonia, Guam, Lithuania, Rwanda, Slovenia, and the Virgin Islands each made their debut in the men's individual road race; some former Soviet republics competed as the Unified Team and some Yugoslav cyclists competed as Independent Olympic Participants. Great Britain made its 14th appearance in the event, the only nation to have competed in each appearance to date.

Competition format and course

The mass-start race was on a 194.4 kilometre course over the Sant Sadurni Cycling Circuit.

Schedule

All times are Central European Summer Time (UTC+2)

Results

During the penultimate lap, Casartelli, Dekker, and Ozols managed to break away from the lead pack; they maintained separation and finished in the medals with Casartelli winning the final sprint.

References

External links
 Official Report

Road cycling at the 1992 Summer Olympics
Oly
Cycling at the Summer Olympics – Men's road race
Men's events at the 1992 Summer Olympics